Meketaten (meaning "Behold the Aten" or "Protected by Aten") was the second daughter of six born to the Egyptian Pharaoh Akhenaten and his Great Royal Wife Nefertiti. She likely lived between Year 4 and Year 14 of Akhenaten's reign. Although little is known about her, she is frequently depicted with her sisters accompanying her royal parents in the first two-thirds of the Amarna Period.

Biography
Meketaten was born approximately in Year 4 of Akhenaten's reign to that pharaoh and his Great Royal Wife, Nefertiti. She had an elder sister, Meritaten, and four younger sisters: Ankhesenpaaten, Neferneferuaten Tasherit, Neferneferure and Setepenre. Tutankhaten was likely a full or half-brother through their father.

Her birth year is estimated based on the dates of inscriptions that reference her. The first known depiction of Meketaten is on the walls of the Hwt-benben temple in Thebes, which is dedicated to her mother Nefertiti. Meketaten additionally appears behind Meritaten in later inscriptions, thought to date to Year 4 or later. Further, her figure was added to a Boundary Stela at Akhetaten that states events from Year 4 and was carved in Year 5.

Meketaten and the royal family moved to Akhetaten, or Amarna, while she was still a small child. The tombs of the Amarnan nobility depict the royal family, including Meketaten, in various scenes of royal life. In Ay's tomb, Meketaten is depicted holding a tray of gifts while wrapping an arm around Nefertiti’s neck. Meketaten attended the Year 12 reception of foreign tributes with her parents and sisters. that can be seen on several scenes in the private tombs in Amarna of high-ranking officials named Huya and High Priest Meryre II.

Other monuments mentioning Meketaten include a stela from Heliopolis, a statue base from the Fayoum, and the tombs of Panehesy and Parennefer.

Theory of incestual marriage with Akhenaten 
Some Egyptologists have speculated that Meketaten, along with her sisters Meritaten and Ankhesenpaaten, married her father and conceived a child with him. There was precedent at the time for such a marriage as her aunt, Sitamun, had married her own father and Meketaten's grandfather, Amunhotep III. The theory stems from the depiction of a royal baby in the royal tomb, leading to the theory that Meketaten died in childbirth. Further, she is depicted under a canopy that is typically associated with childbirth. The assumption is that the father would most likely Akhenaten. However, the theory cannot be proven. 

The portrayal of Meketaten under a canopy could also be interpreted as the princess being reborn. One theory suggests that one of the scenes depicts Kiya dying while birthing Tutankhaten. A final theory suggests that the child depicted in the scenes is the ka, or soul, of Meketaten. Therefore, the image would symbolically represent the death and rebirth of Meketaten who had now gone to Aten in the afterlife.

Death and Burial 
Meketaten died in approximately Year 14 of Akhenaten's reign. If she did not die in childbirth as discussed above, she most likely died of a plague along with other members of the royal family. Between Years 12 and 15, many members of the royal family disappear from the record and cease to be mentioned again: Queen Mother Tiye, King's Wife Kiya, and the King's Daughters Neferneferure, Setepenre, and Meketaten. 

Meketaten was likely buried in the Royal Tomb at Akhetaten, where fragments of her sarcophagus were found. Inscriptions upon the fragments mention her parents, her sister Ankhesenpaaten, and her grandparents Amenhotep III and Queen Tiye. While the names in the scene in the chamber denoted  have been hacked out, hieroglyphs in chamber  identify a portrayal of a dead young woman as Meketaten.

In chamber , another scene shows a figure labeled Meketaten standing under a canopy. In front of her, stand Akhenaten, Nefertiti, and their three daughters, Meritaten, Ankhesenpaaten, and Neferneferuaten Tasherit. Several others scenes within the tomb possibly relate to her. The pharaoh and his Great Royal Wife weep and grip each other's arms for support. Behind them, a nurse cradles a baby in her arms and is accompanied by a fan-bearer, which indicates the baby's royal status. This is the child theorized to be Meketaten's above.

References

Princesses of the Eighteenth Dynasty of Egypt
14th-century BC Egyptian women
Deaths in childbirth
Children of Akhenaten
Nefertiti